Luigi Luisoni (7 December 1907 – 7 April 1982) was a Swiss racing cyclist. He rode in the 1933 Tour de France.

References

1907 births
1982 deaths
Swiss male cyclists
Place of birth missing